Neelabh Banerjee is an Indian cartoonist, illustrator and comics artist. He created the character of the singing donkey Gardhab Das along with his brother cartoonist Jayanto Banerjee for the Indian children's magazine Target.

He is currently the national creative director at Reliance Industries. His animation series named Breaking Toons appear on CNN-IBN, IBN7 and ETV channels.

Career 

Neelabh was born in Lucknow in 1965. He started his career as a crime reporter at The Pioneer and later worked as a cartoonist and illustrator for Target magazine. He moved on to become a staff artist at the Times of India, where he was the national arts and illustrations editor. At the Times of India, Neelabh collaborated with associate editor Jug Suraiya to create the popular comic strip Dubyaman, 'a deranged superhero destined to skid on the banana peel of his own ineptitude' based on American president George Bush. The comic strips were collected in a book, Dubyaman's Duniya, which appeared in 2002. The two have also collaborated on the strip Duniya ke Neta which appeared in the Times of India.

Bibliography
Neelabh collaborates with various people (Jug Suraiya, Amit Dasgupta, Ajit Ninan, Ravi Shankar, Aniruddha Bahal) to produce the strips.

See also
Jug Suraiya
Gardhab Das

References

External links
Neelabh Banerjee's website
Neelabh Banerjee on *Twitter
Neelabh Banerjee on *Facebook
Dubyaman cartoon strip gallery
Neelabh at Lambiek.net

Indian cartoonists
Indian editorial cartoonists
Indian comics artists
1965 births
Living people
Artists from Lucknow
Articles containing video clips